The 2017–18 FC Tosno season was the club's first season in the Russian Premier League, the highest tier of association football in Russia. They finished the season in 15th position, being relegated back to the FNL at the first opportunity, whilst also winning the 2017–18 Cup. Due to Tosno failing to obtain a UEFA licence, they did not qualify for the 2018–19 UEFA Europa League. Krasnodar, the fourth-placed team in the Russian Premier League, entered the group stage instead of the third qualifying round, fifth-placed Zenit St.Petersburg, entered the third qualifying round instead of the second qualifying round, and sixth-placed FC Ufa took the second qualifying round berth.

Squad

Out on loan

Transfers

Summer

In:

Out:

Winter

In:

Out:

Competitions

Russian Premier League

Results by round

Results

League table

Russian Cup

Final

Squad statistics

Appearances and goals

|-
|colspan="14"|Players away from the club on loan:

|-
|colspan="14"|Players who left Tosno during the season:

|}

Goal scorers

Disciplinary record

References

FC Tosno seasons
Tosno